Rai Ghulam Mujtaba Kharral is a Pakistani politician who was a member of the National Assembly of Pakistan from 2008 to 2013.

Political career
He ran for the seat of the National Assembly of Pakistan from Constituency NA-143 (Okara-I) as a candidate of Pakistan Peoples Party (PPP) in 2002 Pakistani general election, but was unsuccessful. He received 39,301 votes and lost the seat to Rai Muhammad Aslam Khan, a candidate of Pakistan Muslim League (Q) (PML-Q).

He was elected to the National Assembly from Constituency NA-143 (Okara-I) as a candidate of PPP in 2008 Pakistani general election. He received 63,960 votes and defeated Muhammad Aslam Khan Kharral, a candidate of PML-Q.

In 2013, his National Assembly membership was suspended due to dual nationality.

References

Living people
Pakistani MNAs 2008–2013
Year of birth missing (living people)